Roderic O'Connor (October 29, 1907 – March 6, 2001) was an American painter. His work was part of the painting event in the art competition at the 1928 Summer Olympics.

References

1907 births
2001 deaths
20th-century American painters
American male painters
Olympic competitors in art competitions
People from Clamart
20th-century American male artists